Sandra Scott (born November 14, 1961) is an American politician who has served in the Georgia House of Representatives from the 76th district since 2011.

References

1961 births
Living people
Democratic Party members of the Georgia House of Representatives
African-American Christians
African-American women in politics
African-American state legislators in Georgia (U.S. state)
21st-century American politicians
21st-century American women politicians
21st-century African-American women
21st-century African-American politicians
20th-century African-American people
20th-century African-American women